Vangel Ajanovski-Oče (1909–1996) was the initiator and communist leader of Macedonian national organizations such as the Macedonian Anti-Fascist Organization (MAO) and the Secret Macedonian Organization for Liberation (TOMO). He then became the secretary of the Voden (Edessa) regional committee of the People's Liberation Front (NOF), a communist political and military organization created by the Slavic Macedonian minority in Greece. He was an organizational secretary of the central council of NOF for sections of the Slavic Macedonian minority in northwestern Greece. He died aged 87 in 1996. His sons are Risto Ajanovski - Taki, Georgi Ajanovski.

References

1909 births
1996 deaths
People from Edessa, Greece
People from Salonica vilayet
Slavic speakers of Greek Macedonia
Macedonian politicians
Macedonian communists